In mathematics, an operator or transform is a function from one space of functions to another. Operators occur commonly in engineering, physics and mathematics. Many are integral operators and differential operators.

In the following L is an operator

which takes a function  to another function .

See also
 List of transforms
 List of Fourier-related transforms
 Transfer operator
 Fredholm operator
 Borel transform
 Glossary of mathematical symbols

Operators
Operators
Operators